Zell am Main is a municipality in the district of Würzburg in Bavaria in Germany, situated on the river Main.

Notable people
 Andreas Friedrich Bauer
 Andreas Joseph Fahrmann
 Andreas Joseph Hofmann
 Abraham Rice

References

Würzburg (district)